Tytthoscincus temasekensis, common name Singapore swamp skink, is a species of skinks belonging to the family Scincidae.

Etymology
The species name temasekensis derives from the word  meaning 'Sea Town' in Old Javanese, an ancient name of a settlement in Singapore. As the Latin suffix  means 'from a place', the epithet temasekensis can be translated from Singapore.

Distribution
This uncommon species is present in Singapore, and in restricted areas of the Peninsular Malaysia.

Habitat
Singapore swamp skink occurs in freshwater swamp forest, in peat swamp areas and close to shallow streams.

Description
These small skinks have an elongate and dorso-ventrally flattened body, with smooth scales. Limbs and feet are tiny, short and slender. Its dorsal basic colour is dark brown, with a pale line from the head to the end of the tail. The abdomen is pale brownish. Young skinks are pale brown and slightly pinkish.

Behavior
These skinks are skilled swimmers and very elusive. Usually they hide amongst or beneath leaf litter next to streams or swamps.

References

External links
 The Biodiversity of Singapore

Lizards of Asia
Tytthoscincus